Stefan Zünd (born 3 July 1969) is a Swiss former ski jumper. He competed in the normal hill and large hill events at the 1992 Winter Olympics. Along with Jan Boklöv and Jiří Malec, he was an early pioneer of the V-style.

Career
At the 1992 Winter Olympics in Albertville, he finished eighth in the team large hill and 20th in the individual normal hill events. Zünd's best finish at the FIS Nordic World Ski Championships was at Val di Fiemme in 1991 where he finished sixth in the team large hill and fifth in the individual large hill events. His best finish at the Ski-flying World Championships was sixth at Planica in 1994.

Zünd earned four individual World Cup career wins at various hills from 1991 to 1992.

World Cup

Standings

Wins

References

External links

Ski jumpers at the 1992 Winter Olympics
Living people
Swiss male ski jumpers
1969 births
Olympic ski jumpers of Switzerland
Sportspeople from Zürich